This Means War! is the ninth studio album of the Christian rock band, Petra. It was released in 1987.

In this album, the band started to refine their movement into a more hard rock/arena rock sound, still retaining keyboard synthesizers to back the driving guitar work. This album also signaled the beginning of a military motif present in the song lyrics that the band would carry through several of their following albums.

Track listing

Awards
 Nominated for Grammy Award for Best Gospel Performance in 1987.
 Won the Netherlands's Contemporary Christian album of the year in 1988.

Personnel 
Petra
 Bob Hartman – lead guitars, additional programming, arrangements
 John Schlitt – lead vocals, background vocals
 John Lawry – keyboards, computer programming, background vocals
 Mark Kelly – bass guitar, background vocals
 Louie Weaver – drums, additional programming

Additional musicians
 John Elefante – additional programming, background vocals, arrangements
 Tim Heintz – additional programming
 Dino Elefante – arrangements
 Tom Hrbacek and Los Alamitos High School Marching Drummers – percussion on "This Means War"

Production
 John Elefante – producer, engineer, mixing at Pakaderm Studio, Los Alamitos, California
 Dino Elefante – producer, engineer, mixing
 Mike Mireau – engineer
 Steve Hall – mastering at Future Disc, Los Angeles
 Dave Rogers – art direction, design
 Chris Hopkins – illustration

References

1987 albums
Petra (band) albums